Little Bosullow is a  hamlet in the civil parish of Madron, Cornwall, England, UK. Great Bosullow is to the west, Bosullow is on the B3312 Madron to Morvah road and Bosullow Common is to the north.

History
The Bosullow Wesleyan Methodists Chapel  at Little Bosullow was renovated at the end of 1878 and reopened on 12 January 1879.

Great and Little Bosullow were put out to tender on 10 June 1880 for a term of seven or fourteen years from the next Michaelmas.

On 19 May 1882 the cornerstone for a new school was laid by Mr T R Bolitho of Pedndrea, Gulval. It held forty pupils.

References

Hamlets in Cornwall
Penwith